Dan Peter Dalle (born 5 December 1956) is a Swedish actor, comedian, writer and film director. Dalle grew up in Täby outside Stockholm. He is most famous for Lorry. Most recently he wrote and directed a 1939-set thriller En fiende att dö för (An Enemy To Die For), which had its world premiere in March 2012 in Stockholm.

Biography 
Peter Dalle grew up in Täby, Stockholm County. Together with Ulf Larsson, he founded the Cocosteatern there in 1976.

Dalle graduated from the Swedish National Academy of Mime and Acting in Stockholm in 1984 and became known to the general public through his role as Pierre Waldén in the TV series Good Neighbors (1987). Dalle became really established through the TV series Lorry which was broadcast for the first time in 1989. He has directed several feature films, including Drömkåken, Ogifta par – en film som skiljer sig and Illusive Tracks.

Peter Dalle collaborated with Hans Alfredson in the revue Prins korv under taket (1999). He has directed several productions of Dramaten, including Markurells i Wadköping by Hjalmar Bergman. Peter Dalle has always alternated directing assignments with acting, among his theater roles can be mentioned the police in the successful farce Lögn i helvete with Robert Gustafsson at Vasateatern and Lorrygänget's revue at Oscarsteatern in Stockholm. In the summer of 2010, Dalle was part of the production of Zpanska flugan in Kalmar and in the autumn of 2013, together with Johan Ulveson, he did over 130 roles in the thriller comedy The 39 Steps at Intiman in Stockholm.

Filmography
 Charlie Strapp and Froggy Ball Flying High (voice) (1991)
 Drömkåken (1993)
 Behind Blue Skies (2010)
 Ravens (2017)
 The Snowman (2017)

References

Sources

External links
 
 

Swedish male actors
Swedish comedians
Swedish film directors
Sommar (radio program) hosts
Living people
1956 births
Best Supporting Actor Guldbagge Award winners
Best Screenplay Guldbagge Award winners